A list of British films released in 1993.

1993

See also
 1993 in film
 1993 in British music
 1993 in British radio
 1993 in British television
 1993 in the United Kingdom
 List of 1993 box office number-one films in the United Kingdom

External links

1993
Films
British